Desmia tages is a moth in the family Crambidae. It was described by Pieter Cramer in 1777. It is found in Cuba, Jamaica, Puerto Rico, Florida, Costa Rica, and Mexico.

References

Moths described in 1777
Desmia
Moths of North America